Nosral Recordings is a Christian metal record label based out of Madison, Wisconsin, United States. The label originated in 2017, as a sister-label of Rottweiler Records, by Mike Larson of Frost Like Ashes. Shortly after forming in April, by May the label signed Ascending King, their first act. Several acts signed to the label by 2018, including Symphony of Heaven, Nuclear Blaze, Children of Wrath, Cruentis and Enemy of Satan. Eventually, Nosral became a full-on independent label from Rottweiler. In 2019, the label closed and became defunct.

Last Known Roster
The Abrasive Realization (disbanded)
Ascending King (active)
Cruentis (active)
Enemy of Satan (active)
Frostnoise (active)
I.N.R.I (active)
Light Unseen (active)
Nattesorg (active)
Nuclear Blaze (active)
Old Man Frost (active)
Outrage A.D. (active)
Symphony of Heaven (active, Rottweiler Records)
Thief on the Cross (active)
Trinityria Hvitetrone (active)
Unblack Metal Fist (active)

Former
The Beckoning (disbanded)
Children of Wrath (active, independent)
Dead Human Prophecies (disbanded, as The Abrasive Realization)
Frost Like Ashes (active, Rottweiler Records)
Katharos (active, as Tordenskrall)
Shadow Puncher (active, independent)

Associated Acts
Ambianicnoise (active, Naorg Production)
Cephalophore (active)
Cryptic Rising (active, independent)
Fear of Ghost (active)
Frostbreath (active)
Ghlavkdur (active)
Noisechrist (active)
Prophetic (active)
Solomon Kane (active)
Thundertrance (active, Naorg Production)

Discography

References

External links

American record labels
Christian record labels
Heavy metal record labels
Record labels established in 2017